Fabrizio Pedrazzini (born 5 May 1979 in Milan) is a former ice dancer who represented Italy.  With partner Valentina Anselmi, he finished second at the Italian Figure Skating Championships in 2001 and third in 2002.  In both years, they also competed at the World Figure Skating Championships.  He later teamed up with Marta Paoletti and finished second at the Italian Nationals in 2003.  That same year, he and Paoletti finished 18th at the European Figure Skating Championships.

References

External links 
 

1979 births
Living people
Sportspeople from Rome
Italian male ice dancers
Competitors at the 2001 Winter Universiade